Rauvolfia (sometimes spelled Rauwolfia) is a genus of evergreen trees and shrubs, commonly known as devil peppers, in the family Apocynaceae.  The genus is named to honor Leonhard Rauwolf.  The genus can mainly be found in tropical regions of Africa, Asia, Latin America, and various oceanic islands.

Spelling
The International Code of Nomenclature for algae, fungi, and plants stipulates that the genus name was established by Carl Linnaeus in his 1753 book Species Plantarum, which cites his earlier description
which states in Botanical Latin that the name is dedicated "to Leonhard Rauwolf": "Leon. Rauvolfio". Although some subsequent authors hypercorrected the Classical Latin letter "v" to a modern "w", this is not accepted by the code of nomenclature.

Chemical constituents
Rauvolfia serpentina, commonly known as Indian snakeroot or sarpagandha, contains many indole alkaloids.

Medicinal uses

Reserpine is an alkaloid first isolated from R. serpentina and was widely used as an antihypertensive drug

Conservation 
Rauvolfia serpentina is declining in the wild due to collection for its medicinal uses. Consequently, it is listed in CITES Appendix II. Rauvolfia vomitoria is a highly invasive species in Hawaii, and is capable of establishing dense monotypic stands.

Species 
Species include:

formerly included
 Rauvolfia celastrifolia Baker = Stephanostegia hildebrandtii Baill.
 Rauvolfia dentata Tafalla ex D.Don = Citharexylum dentatum D.Don
 Rauvolfia flexuosa Ruiz & Pav. = Citharexylum flexuosum (Ruiz & Pav.) D.Don
 Rauvolfia glabra Cav. = Vallesia glabra (Cav.) Link
 Rauvolfia laevigata Willd. ex Roem. & Schult. = Tabernaemontana amygdalifolia Jacq.
 Rauvolfia longifolia A.DC. = Alstonia longifolia (A.DC.) Pichon
 Rauvolfia macrophylla Ruiz & Pav. 1799 not Stapf 1894 = Citharexylum flexuosum (Ruiz & Pav.) D.Don
 Rauvolfia oppositifolia Spreng. 1822 not Sessé & Moc. 1888 = Tabernaemontana oppositifolia (Spreng.) Urb.
 Rauvolfia pubescens Willd. ex Roem. & Schult. = Citharexylum quitense Spreng.
 Rauvolfia spinosa Cav. = Citharexylum flexuosum (Ruiz & Pav.) D.Don
 Rauvolfia stenophylla Donn.Sm. = Alstonia longifolia (A.DC.) Pichon
 Rauvolfia strempelioides Griseb. = Strempeliopsis strempelioides (Griseb.) Benth. ex B.D.Jacks.
 Rauvolfia striata Poir. = Ochrosia borbonica J.F.Gmel.

References

Bibliography
 

 
Medicinal plants
Apocynaceae genera